Hypotia theopoldi is a species of snout moth in the genus Hypotia. It was described by Hans Georg Amsel in 1956 and is known from Jordan.

References

Moths described in 1956
Hypotiini